Gaono Street is a street in the Old Town of Vilnius, the capital of Lithuania. The street was part of the Jewish quarter of Vilnius, and it is named after the Vilna Gaon, who previously lived there.

References 

Streets in Vilnius